Jubilee Hill is situated in the range of Malvern Hills that runs about  north-south along the Herefordshire-Worcestershire border.

Jubilee Hill was named by the Malvern Hills Conservators in 2002 in honour of The Queen's Golden Jubilee. The Duke of York unveiled a plaque at the top of the hill, commemorating its new identity, in 2003.

The plaque was taken away by someone sometime in March/April 2018.

The site was also previously known, and is still today by a group of locals, as 'Dad's Hill', after a well-loved local bicycle shop-owner called Mr Earp who climbed Jubilee Hill frequently. Commemorated there upon his passing a local group still climb the hill on the same day every year in his name.

Jubilee Drive, the road which runs along the western (Herefordshire) side of the hills, was built and named for the Golden Jubilee of Queen Victoria, in 1887.

References

External links
Jubilee Hill Walk

Hills of Worcestershire
Malvern Hills